Methysergide, sold under the brand names Deseril and Sansert, is a monoaminergic medication of the ergoline and lysergamide groups which is used in the prophylaxis and treatment of migraine and cluster headaches. It has been withdrawn from the market in the United States and Canada due to adverse effects. It is taken by mouth.

Methysergide is no longer recommended as a first line treatment protocol by international headache societies, hospitals, and neurologists in private practice, for migraines or cluster headaches as side effects were first reported with long-term use in the late 1960s, and ergot-based treatments fell out of favor for the treatment of migraines with the introduction of triptans in the 1980s.

Medical uses
Methysergide is used exclusively to treat episodic and chronic migraine and for episodic and chronic cluster headaches. Methysergide is one of the most effective medications for the prevention of migraine, but is not intended for the treatment of an acute attack, it is to be taken daily as a preventative medication.

Migraine and cluster headaches
Methysergide has been known as an effective treatment for migraine and cluster headache for over 50 years. A 2016 investigation by the European Medicines Agency due to long-held questions about safety concerns was performed. To assess the need for continuing availability of methysergide, the International Headache Society performed an electronic survey among their professional members.

The survey revealed that 71.3% of all respondents had ever prescribed methysergide and 79.8% would prescribe it if it were to become available. Respondents used it more in cluster headache than migraine, and reserved it for use in refractory patients.

The European Medicines Agency concluded "that the vast majority of headache experts in this survey regarded methysergide a unique treatment option for specific populations for which there are no alternatives, with an urgent need to continue its availability."

This position was supported by the International Headache Society.

Updated guidelines published by Britain's National Health Service Migraine Trust in 2014 recommended "Methysergide medicines are now only to be used for preventing severe intractable migraine and cluster headache when standard medicines have failed".

Other uses
Methysergide is also used in carcinoid syndrome to treat severe diarrhea. It may also be used in the treatment of serotonin syndrome.

Side effects
It has a known side effect, retroperitoneal fibrosis/retropulmonary fibrosis, which is severe, although uncommon. This side effect has been estimated to occur in 1/5000 patients. In addition, there is an increased risk of left-sided cardiac valve dysfunction.

Pharmacology

Pharmacodynamics
Methysergide interacts with the serotonin 5-HT1A, 5-HT1B, 5-HT1D, 5-HT1E, 5-HT1F, 5-HT2A, 5-HT2B, 5-HT2C, 5-HT5A, 5-HT6, and 5-HT7 receptors and the α2A-, α2B-, and α2C-adrenergic receptors. It does not have significant affinity for human 5-HT3, dopamine, α1-adrenergic, β-adrenergic, acetylcholine, GABA, glutamate, cannabinoid, or histamine receptors, nor for the monoamine transporters. Methysergide is an agonist of 5-HT1 receptors, including a partial agonist at the 5-HT1A receptor, and is an antagonist at the 5-HT2A, 5-HT2B, 5-HT2C, and 5-HT7 receptors. Methysergide is metabolized into methylergometrine in humans, which in contrast to methysergide is a partial agonist of the 5-HT2A and 5-HT2B receptors and also interacts with various other targets.

Methysergide antagonizes the effects of serotonin in blood vessels and gastrointestinal smooth muscle, but has few of the properties of other ergot alkaloids. It is thought that metabolism of methysergide into methylergonovine is responsible for the antimigraine effects of methysergide. Methylergonovine appears to be 10 times more potent than methysergide as an agonist of the 5-HT1B and 5-HT1D receptors and has higher intrinsic efficacy in activating these receptors. Methysergide produces psychedelic effects at high doses (3.5–7.5 mg). Metabolism of methysergide into methylergometrine is considered to be responsible for the psychedelic effects of methysergide. The psychedelic effects can specifically be attributed to activation of the 5-HT2A receptor. The medication can activate the 5-HT2B receptor due to metabolism into methylergometrine and for this reason has been associated with cardiac valvulopathy. It is thought that the serotonin receptor antagonism of methysergide is not able to overcome the serotonin receptor agonism of methylergonovine due to the much higher levels of methylergonovine during methysergide therapy.

Pharmacokinetics
The oral bioavailability of methysergide is 13% due to high first-pass metabolism into methylergometrine. Methysergide produces methylergometrine as a major active metabolite. Levels of methylergometrine are about 10-fold higher than those of methysergide during methysergide therapy. As such, methysergide may be considered a prodrug of methylergonovine. The elimination half-life of methylergonovine is almost four times as long as that of methysergide.

Chemistry
Methysergide, also known as N-[(2S)-1-hydroxybutan-2-yl]-1,6-dimethyl-9,10-didehydroergoline-8α-carboxamide or N-(1-(hydroxymethyl)propyl)-1-methyl-D-lysergamide, is a derivative of the ergolines and lysergamides and is structurally related to other members of these families, for instance lysergic acid diethylamide (LSD).

History
Harold Wolff's theory of vasodilation in migraine is well-known. Less known is his search for a perivascular factor that would damage local tissues and increase pain sensitivity during migraine attacks. Serotonin was found to be among the candidate agents to be included.

In the same period, serotonin was isolated (1948) and, because of its actions, an anti-serotonin drug was needed.

Methysergide was synthesized from lysergic acid by adding a methyl group and a butanolamid group. This resulted in a compound with selectivity and high potency as a serotonin (5-HT) inhibitor. Based on the possible involvement of serotonin in migraine attacks, it was introduced in 1959 by Sicuteri as a preventive drug for migraine. The clinical effect was often excellent, but 5 years later it was found to cause retroperitoneal fibrosis after chronic intake.

Consequently, the use of the drug in migraine declined considerably, but it was still used as a 5-HT antagonist in experimental studies. In 1974 Saxena showed that methysergide had a selective vasoconstrictor effect in the carotid bed and in 1984 he found an atypical receptor. This finding provided an incentive for the development of sumatriptan.

Novartis withdrew it from the U.S. market after taking over Sandoz, but currently lists it as a discontinued product.

Production and availability
US production of Methysergide, (Sansert), was discontinued on the manufacturer's own behalf in 2002. Sansert had previously been produced by Sandoz, which merged with Ciba-Geigy in 1996, and led to the creation of Novartis. In 2003 Novartis united its global generics businesses under a single global brand, with the Sandoz name and product line reviewed and reestablished.

Society and culture

Controversy
Methysergide has been an effective treatment for migraine and cluster headache for over 50 years but has systematically been suppressed from the migraine and cluster headache marketplace for over 15 years due to unqualified risk benefit/ratio safety concerns.

Many cite the potential side effects of retroperitoneal/retropulmonary fibrosis as the prime reason methysergide is no longer frequently prescribed, but retroperitoneal fibrosis, and retropulmonary fibrosis, were documented as side effects as early as 1966, and 1967, respectively.

References

External links
 Novartis Sansert site.
 Novartis Sansert product description.
 Migraines.org More detailed information on methysergide.
 neurologychannel.com, general information on migraines.
 History of methysergide in migraine.

Antimigraine drugs
Lysergamides
Prodrugs
Serotonin receptor antagonists
Serotonin receptor agonists